Gholam Mohammad (also Romanized as Gholām Moḩammad; also known as Gholam Mohammad Pūdīneh and Khāneh-ye Gholām Moḩammad) is a village in Dust Mohammad Rural District, in the Central District of Hirmand County, Sistan and Baluchestan Province, Iran. At the 2006 census, its population was 64, in 17 families.

References 

Populated places in Hirmand County